The Dogar are a Punjabi people of Muslim heritage (bradari). 'Dogar' is commonly used as a last name.

History 
Dogar people settled in Punjab during the Medieval period. They are understood to be a branch of the Rajput (a large cluster of interrelated peoples from the Indian subcontinent). The Dogar initially established themselves as an agricultural people who became owners of land in the relatively arid central area of Punjab where cultivation required vigorous work. In addition to cultivating crops such as jowar (millet) and wheat, they may also have been partly pastoral.

In the late 17th century, the Dogars residing within the faujdari of Lakhi Jangal (in present-day Multan) were among the tribes that challenged the authority of the Mughal emperor Aurangzeb.

The Dogar are referred to in the Sufi poet Waris Shah's renowned tragic romance, Heer Ranjha.

See also 
 Lakhi Jungle

References

Further reading

Social groups of Punjab, Pakistan
Social groups of Punjab, India
Herding castes